Ridge Township is one of the twelve townships of Van Wert County, Ohio, United States.  The 2000 census found 3,114 people in the township, 1,311 of whom lived in the unincorporated portions of the township.

Geography
Located in the central part of the county, it borders the following townships:
Hoaglin Township - north
Jackson Township - northeast corner
Washington Township - east
Jennings Township - southeast corner
York Township - south
Liberty Township - southwest corner
Pleasant Township - west
Union Township - northwest corner

Part of the city of Van Wert, the county seat and largest city of Van Wert County, is located in the western half of Ridge Township.

Ridge Township is one of only two county townships (the other being Pleasant Township) without a border on another county.

Name and history
Statewide, the only other Ridge Township is located in Wyandot County.

Government
The township is governed by a three-member board of trustees, who are elected in November of odd-numbered years to a four-year term beginning on the following January 1. Two are elected in the year after the presidential election and one is elected in the year before it. There is also an elected township fiscal officer, who serves a four-year term beginning on April 1 of the year after the election, which is held in November of the year before the presidential election. Vacancies in the fiscal officership or on the board of trustees are filled by the remaining trustees.

References

External links
County website

Townships in Van Wert County, Ohio
Townships in Ohio